Pascal Arimont (born 25 September 1974) is a Belgian Member of the European Parliament (MEP) for the Christian Social Party, which sits in the EPP Group, as the single MEP from the German-speaking electoral college of Belgium.

Early life and career
Arimont was born in Malmedy and grew up in Born (municipality of Amel) in the German-speaking Community of Belgium.

From 1998 to 2002, Arimont was parliamentary assistant to MEP Mathieu Grosch.

Political career

Role in local politics
From 2006 until 2009, Arimont served as provincial councillor of Liège (and thus advisory member of the Parliament of the German-speaking Community). From 2009 until 2014 he was (full) member of that Parliament, where he was parliamentary group leader for the CSP.

Member of the European Parliament, 2014–present
In 2014, Grosch, who was the single German-speaking MEP since 1994, decided not to stand for re-election, and Arimont was the CSP's candidate in the 2014 European Parliament elections.

In the European Parliament, Arimont serves on the Committee on Regional Development and the Committee on Legal Affairs (since 2021). Since 2021, he has been part of the Parliament's delegation to the Conference on the Future of Europe.

In addition to his committee assignments, Arimont is part of the parliament's delegations for relations with the countries of Central America and to the Euro-Latin American Parliamentary Assembly. He is also a member of the European Parliament Intergroup on the Welfare and Conservation of Animals,

Controversy
In December 2021, Arimont’s house was attacked while his family was inside; a Molotov cocktail was thrown under his children’s bedroom windows.

External links
 Personal website

References

1974 births
Christlich Soziale Partei (Belgium) MEPs
German-speaking Community of Belgium
Living people
MEPs for Belgium 2014–2019
MEPs for Belgium 2019–2024
People from Malmedy